Ann Lee Peebles (born April 27, 1947) is an American singer and songwriter who gained celebrity for her Memphis soul albums of the 1970s for Hi Records. Two of her most popular songs are "I Can't Stand the Rain", which she wrote with her husband Don Bryant and radio broadcaster Bernie Miller, and "I'm Gonna Tear Your Playhouse Down". In 2014, Ann Peebles was inducted into the Memphis Music Hall of Fame.

Biography
She was born in Kinloch, Missouri, the seventh child of eleven.  As a child she began singing in the choir of her father's church and with the family's group, the Peebles Choir, who regularly opened shows for gospel stars including Mahalia Jackson and the Soul Stirrers featuring Sam Cooke.  She was also influenced by R&B performers, including Muddy Waters, Mary Wells and Aretha Franklin.

She began performing in clubs in St. Louis, and in the mid-1960s joined a revue led by bandleader Oliver Sain.  While visiting Memphis in 1968, she sang in a club with trumpeter Gene "Bowlegs" Miller, a popular local bandleader known for helping other musicians, such as the members of the Hi Rhythm Section who played on Peebles' recordings, get their start in the Memphis music industry.  Miller introduced her to Hi Records producer Willie Mitchell, who quickly offered her a recording contract.

Her first record, "Walk Away", written by Sain, reached the R&B chart in 1969, as did the follow-up, "Give Me Some Credit", and she released an album, This Is Ann Peebles.  All her early records on Hi were produced by Mitchell, and featured the signature sound of the Hi Rhythm Section and Memphis Horns.  In 1970, her single "Part Time Love" - a version of Little Johnny Taylor's 1963 hit - reached no. 7 on the R&B chart, and no.45 on the pop chart, and she began working with the Hi label's songwriter Don Bryant. One of the first songs he wrote for her was "99 Pounds" in 1971 – "Good things come in small packages/ You'll have to agree to that" – in 1971; they married in 1974.

She continued to have R&B hits in the early 1970s, including "I Pity the Fool," "Slipped, Tripped and Fell in Love," "Breaking Up Somebody's Home" (a Hot 100 hit in 1973 for Albert King and later recorded by Bette Midler), "Somebody's on Your Case," and "I'm Gonna Tear Your Playhouse Down" (later a hit for Paul Young).  She was also the only female singer on Hi to release a string of albums, including Straight from the Heart and I Can't Stand the Rain, which contained many tracks that she co-wrote with Bryant.  The title track of the latter album, written by Peebles and Bryant with DJ Bernard Miller, was her biggest commercial success, reaching no. 6 on the R&B chart and no. 38 on the pop chart in 1973.
 
Although she continued to have hit R&B singles and to release albums on Hi, none matched the success of "I Can't Stand the Rain".  Mitchell later said: "She was the girl with the big voice who could have really gone further... But I don't think Ann spent enough time thinking about what she needed to do. I don't think she put as much energy into her career as a singer as some of the rest of these people."

After Hi Records closed in 1979, and with the rise of disco music, Peebles took a break from the music industry to spend more time with her family.  She returned in 1989 with the album Call Me, again produced by Willie Mitchell and released on his own Waylo label. During the 1990s, she released albums on Rounder Records'  Bullseye Blues subsidiary label. She continued to perform, and in 2006 she released the album Brand New Classics, which consisted of re-recordings of some of her songs in an acoustic style.  Peebles also joined Cyndi Lauper on a recording of "Rollin' and Tumblin'" on Lauper's 11th studio album, Memphis Blues. She gave up performing after a stroke in 2012.

Discography

Studio albums

Compilation albums

Live albums

Singles

In popular culture
Her name appears in the lyrics of the Le Tigre song "Hot Topic".

Notes

References

External links

1947 births
Living people
Songwriters from Missouri
American soul singers
Musicians from St. Louis
Hi Records artists
Fat Possum Records artists
Singers from Missouri
African-American women songwriters
20th-century African-American women singers